Aleksandar Damyanov (born February 25, 1943) is a Bulgarian sprint canoer who competed in the late 1960s. He finished eighth in the C-2 1000 m event at the 1968 Summer Olympics in Mexico City.

References
Sports-reference.com profile

1943 births
Bulgarian male canoeists
Canoeists at the 1968 Summer Olympics
Living people
Olympic canoeists of Bulgaria